Paul August Runge (September 10, 1907 – April 27, 1972) was a Canadian professional ice hockey player who played 142 games in the National Hockey League between 1930 and 1938.

Early life 
Runge was born in Edmonton, Alberta. He played junior hockey with the Portland Buckaroos and Victoria Cubs.

Career 
Runge played for the Boston Bruins (1930–32, 1936), Montreal Maroons (1933–34, 1936–38), and Montreal Canadiens (1934–36, 1936). The rest of his career, which lasted from 1928 to 1942, was spent in various minor leagues.

Runge played parts of four NHL seasons without recording a goal. His first goal came as a member of the Boston Bruins in his team's 6-3 victory over the Montreal Maroons on December 28, 1935. The game was played at the Montreal Forum. Runge would score eight times for Boston in the 1935-36 season. He would eventually tally 18 NHL goals and 22 assists for 40 career points.

Career statistics

Regular season and playoffs

References

External links
 

1907 births
1972 deaths
Boston Bruins players
Boston Cubs players
Boston Tigers (CAHL) players
Buffalo Bisons (AHL) players
Canadian ice hockey centres
Cleveland Barons (1937–1973) players
Dallas Texans (AHA) players
Minneapolis Millers (AHA) players
Montreal Canadiens players
Montreal Maroons players
New Haven Eagles players
Philadelphia Arrows players
Portland Buckaroos players
Quebec Castors players
St. Paul Saints (AHA) players
Ice hockey people from Edmonton
Windsor Bulldogs (1929–1936) players
Canadian expatriate ice hockey players in the United States